Brüsel is a graphic novel by Belgian comic artists François Schuiten and Benoît Peeters, the fifth volume of their ongoing Les Cités Obscures series. It was first published in serialized form in the Franco-Belgian comics magazine À Suivre (#158-160, 171-173), and as a complete volume first in 1992 by Casterman. In English, it was published as Brüsel (Cities of the Fantastic) in 2001 by NBM Publishing.

Editions

In French 

Brüsel, 1992, Casterman
Brüsel, 1993, Casterman
Brüsel, 1996, Casterman
Brüsel, 1997, Casterman
Brüsel, 2008, Casterman

In English 

Brüsel, 2001, NBM Publishing

External links 
 Brüsel, review
 Brüsel, a few annoted pictures from the album (French)
 Series overview on A comprehensive review of the Obscure Cities series for English-speaking fans
 Les Cités Obscures by Juliani Darius on The Continuity Pages

Steampunk comics
Belgian comics titles